The National Association of Wheat Growers (NAWG) is an advocacy group based in Washington, D.C. that supports the collective interests of wheat farmers in the United States.  

NAWG was founded in 1950, and is structured as a federation of state grain growers associations.

It is affiliated with Wheat PAC, a political action committee, and 
National Wheat Foundation, a charitable organization.

The current chief executive officer is Chandler Goule.

External links
 National Association of Wheat Growers

Agricultural organizations based in the United States
Wheat production
Lobbying organizations in the United States
Grain industry of the United States
Wheat organizations